Hokkaido Wakkanai High School (北海道稚内高等学校, Hokkaidō Wakkanai Kōtō Gakkō) is a high school in Wakkanai, Hokkaido, Japan, founded in 1950. Hokkaido Wakkanai High School is one of high schools administrated by Hokkaido.

The school is operated by the Hokkaido Prefectural Board of Education.

Address
 Address: Sakae-1choume-4-1, Wakkanai, Hokkaido

References

External links
Official Website of Hokkaido Wakkanai High School

High schools in Hokkaido
Educational institutions established in 1950
1950 establishments in Japan
Wakkanai, Hokkaido